Estadio Alexander Botinni is a multi-use stadium in Maturín, Venezuela.  It is currently used mostly for football matches and is the home stadium of Monagas Sport Club.   The stadium holds 8,000 people.

References

Alexander Botinni
Buildings and structures in Monagas
Rugby union stadiums in Venezuela